Carson Springer Fulmer (born December 13, 1993) is an American professional baseball pitcher in the Seattle Mariners organization. He has played in Major League Baseball (MLB) for the Chicago White Sox, Detroit Tigers, Baltimore Orioles, and Cincinnati Reds. He played college baseball for the Vanderbilt Commodores. He was drafted by the White Sox in the first round of the 2015 MLB draft, and he made his MLB debut in 2016.

Amateur career
Fulmer attended All Saints' Academy in Winter Haven, Florida and was drafted by the Boston Red Sox in the 15th round of the 2012 Major League Baseball Draft. He did not sign and attended Vanderbilt University.

As a freshman in 2013, Fulmer, appeared in 26 games as a relief pitcher, going 3–0 with a 2.39 earned run average (ERA), four saves and 51 strikeouts in  innings. Fulmer started his sophomore season in 2014 as a relief pitcher, but was moved to the starting rotation in April. After becoming a starter, he had a 28 innings scoreless streak. In June, he helped the Commodores win the 2014 College World Series against the Virginia Cavaliers after allowing only one earned run in  innings of the third game. He finished the season 7–1 in 26 games (10 starts) with a 1.98 ERA, 10 saves and 95 strikeouts in 91 innings, earning the SEC Pitcher of the Year Award. After the season, he played for the United States collegiate national team during the summer.

As a junior in 2015, Fulmer won the National Pitcher of the Year Award after going 14–2 with a 1.83 ERA with 167 strikeouts over  innings. He was a finalist for the 2015 Golden Spikes Award, presented annually to the nation's top college player.

Professional career

Chicago White Sox 
The Chicago White Sox selected Fulmer in the first round, with the eighth overall selection, of the 2015 MLB Draft. Fulmer signed with the White Sox, receiving a $3,470,600 signing bonus.

After signing, Fulmer was assigned to the AZL White Sox, and after one scoreless appearances, he was promoted to the Winston-Salem Dash where he finished the season, posting a 2.05 ERA in eight starts. He began 2016 with the Birmingham Barons.

Fulmer was called up to the major leagues on July 15, 2016. He made his debut on July 17. He was demoted to the Charlotte Knights on August 17 and spent the remainder of the season there. In 21 starts between Birmingham and Charlotte, Fulmer was 6–10 with a 4.63 ERA, and in eight appearances out of the bullpen for the White Sox, he compiled a 0–2 record and 8.49 ERA.

Fulmer began the 2017 season with Charlotte and was recalled to the White Sox for the first time that season on August 21 to make his first major league start. He gave up six earned runs on four hits and three walks in  innings pitched against the Minnesota Twins, and he was sent back to Charlotte the next day. Fulmer was recalled to Chicago once again in September. In 25 starts for Charlotte he was 7–9 with a 5.79 ERA and in seven games (five starts) for Chicago, he pitched to a 3–1 record and 3.86 ERA.

Fulmer began 2018 in Chicago's starting rotation. However, after going 2–4 with an 8.07 ERA and 1.89 WHIP in nine games, he was optioned to Charlotte on May 18. In 2019, Fulmer was 1–2 in 20 games (2 starts). He had an ERA of 6.26 in  innings. On July 23, 2020, Fulmer was designated for assignment by the White Sox.

Detroit Tigers 
On July 25, 2020, Fulmer was claimed off waivers by the Detroit Tigers. He was designated for assignment by the Tigers on August 20, 2020. In his brief time with the Tigers, Fulmer pitched to a 6.75 ERA over  innings and allowed five runs including one home run.

Baltimore Orioles 
On August 24, 2020, Fulmer was claimed off waivers by the Pittsburgh Pirates. Fulmer was designated for assignment by the Pirates on September 2 without appearing in a game. On September 5, 2020, Fulmer was claimed off waivers by the Baltimore Orioles. Fulmer did not allow a run over  innings pitched for the Orioles.

On September 21, 2020, Fulmer was again claimed off waivers by the Pittsburgh Pirates. On March 7, 2021, Fulmer was designated for assignment following the acquisition of Duane Underwood Jr.

Cincinnati Reds
On March 14, 2021, Fulmer was claimed off waivers by the Cincinnati Reds. Fulmer recorded a 6.66 ERA in 20 appearances before being designated for assignment on May 21. He was outrighted to the Triple-A Louisville Bats on May 24.

Los Angeles Dodgers
On December 8, 2021, the Los Angeles Dodgers selected Fulmer from the Reds in the minor league phase of the Rule 5 draft. The Dodgers added him to the 40-man roster and called him up to the majors on April 30, 2022. He was designated for assignment two days later, without appearing in a major league game for the Dodgers. On May 13, Fulmer was released by the Dodgers. However, the next day, Fulmer re-signed with the Dodgers on a minor league contract.

He returned to Oklahoma City, where on the season he appeared in 49 games with a 6–6 record, a 2.86 ERA and 12 saves. He elected free agency on October 14, 2022.

Seattle Mariners
On February 10, 2023, Fulmer signed a minor league contract with the Seattle Mariners organization.

Personal
Fulmer married his high school sweetheart, Sabina Vargas, in November 2017 in Malibu, California.

See also
Rule 5 draft results

References

External links

Vanderbilt Commodores bio

1993 births
Living people
Sportspeople from Lakeland, Florida
Baseball players from Florida
Major League Baseball pitchers
Chicago White Sox players
Detroit Tigers players
Baltimore Orioles players
Cincinnati Reds players
Vanderbilt Commodores baseball players
Arizona League White Sox players
Winston-Salem Dash players
Birmingham Barons players
Charlotte Knights players
All-American college baseball players
Oklahoma City Dodgers players